Fat Music for Fat People is a compilation album released by the Fat Wreck Chords record label on August 11, 1994. It was  the label's first sampler compilation and became the first installment in the Fat Music series, which continued until 2002 with six installments then resumed in 2010. The compilation's title is a parody of the 1982 Go! Records compilation "Rat Music for Rat People".

Track listing

References

Fat Music compilations
1994 compilation albums